Rujm ash Shara'irah is a town in the Amman Governorate of north-western Jordan. It is located north-west of the capital Amman and off Highway 25.

See also
Rujm

References

Populated places in Amman Governorate